Darren Saunders (born 16 August 1965) is a former Australian rules footballer who played with Footscray and Collingwood in the Victorian/Australian Football League (VFL/AFL).

Saunders, a defender, came to Footscray from Kingsville. An Altona resident originally zoned to South Melbourne Saunders was dealt to Footscray as his grandmother resided in Seddon He made six appearances in the 1986 VFL season, then had a stint at East Ballarat. In 1987 he began playing for Collingwood and his seven games that year included a semi final loss to Melbourne. He played four games in Collingwood's premiership year, 1990, the last in round five.

After his AFL career ended, Saunders played for Victorian Football Association club Werribee.

References

1965 births
Australian rules footballers from Victoria (Australia)
Western Bulldogs players
Collingwood Football Club players
Werribee Football Club players
East Ballarat Football Club players
Living people